
Gmina Lelów is a rural gmina (administrative district) in Częstochowa County, Silesian Voivodeship, in southern Poland.

Villages
Gmina Lelów contains the villages and settlements of Biała Wielka, Celiny, Drochlin, Gródek, Konstantynów, Lelów, Lgota Błotna, Lgota Gawronna, Mełchów, Nakło, Paulinów, Podlesie, Posłoda, Skrajniwa, Ślęzany, Staromieście and Turzyn.

Neighbouring gminas
Gmina Lelów is bordered by the gminas of Irządze, Janów, Koniecpol, Niegowa, Przyrów and Szczekociny.

References

Lelow
Częstochowa County